Steven Waddington (born 30 December 1967) is an English film and television actor. He is best known for his supporting role in Michael Mann's The Last of the Mohicans.

Early life
Waddington was born in Leeds, West Riding of Yorkshire, the younger child of Peter Waddington and Averill Stubbs. He attended Old Farnley Primary School, Ryecroft Middle School and Intake High School, both in Leeds. He acted in school plays and appeared in several Yorkshire Television productions, among them Emmerdale Farm and Eighteen Desperate Hours, sometimes as an extra and sometimes with a few lines of dialogue. Shortly after his eighteenth birthday he won a place at East 15 Acting School in Loughton, Essex.

He finished his training in the summer of 1989 and subsequently joined the Royal Shakespeare Company (RSC), first at Stratford, and then at the Barbican and on tour in Newcastle. He was cast in his first film, Edward II, in the title role, after being recommended to director Derek Jarman by fellow actor Nigel Terry, with whom he had worked previously in a production of Pericles at the RSC.

Career

Waddington starred as Prasutagus in the 2003 film Boudica as well the Duke of Buckingham (who, coincidentally, was related to Edward II) in the Showtime series The Tudors, released on 1 April 2007 in the United States. He also appeared in Tim Burton's 1999 film version of Sleepy Hollow as Mr Killian. He played a lead role as Jeff in Steve Coogan's The Parole Officer (2001).

He later appeared in the ITV drama Vital Signs along with Tamzin Outhwaite, and starred as King Richard in the Series 2 finale of Robin Hood. Waddington also starred as Wilfred of Ivanhoe in the 1997 BBC/A&E production of Ivanhoe, based on the novel by Sir Walter Scott. Waddington reprised his role as Richard the Lionheart in the BBC/Discovery Channel drama documentary Heroes and Villains: Richard the Lionheart (2007).

From April to July 2010 he portrayed canteen head Adam Fleet in Waterloo Road. He featured in two Swedish films. In 2008 he played the role of Arnold of Torroja in the film and mini-series Arn - The Knight Templar and McCullen in Agent Hamilton: But Not If It Concerns Your Daughter in 2012. In 2012 he appeared in the four-part ITV mini-series Titanic.

He is played the role of Marshall Redwick in the Sky One series Jamestown, which premiered in 2017. 

He also had a part in Thomas Vinterberg's 2018 political thriller Kursk, based on the true story of a doomed Russian submarine.

In 2022, he played The Scotsman in Uncharted, opposite Tom Holland and Mark Wahlberg.

Personal life
Waddington is married to actress and model Jane March, and has one son.

Filmography

Film

Television

References

External links

1967 births
20th-century English male actors
21st-century English male actors
Alumni of East 15 Acting School
English male film actors
English male television actors
Living people
Male actors from Leeds
Male actors from Yorkshire
English expatriates in the United States